"Waitin' on a Woman" is a song written by Don Sampson and Wynn Varble, and recorded three times by American country music artist Brad Paisley. His first recording of the song was included on his 2005 album Time Well Wasted. Three years later, Paisley re-recorded the song for inclusion on a re-issue of his 2007 album 5th Gear. This re-recorded version was issued on 9 June 2008 and became the twenty-first chart single of Paisley's career and became the twelfth number 1 single of his career and his eighth consecutive number 1 single. The song also appeared on Play with a guest vocal from Andy Griffith.

Content
The song is a mid-tempo composed of three verses. Its central character is a recently married male sitting on a bench at a shopping mall, waiting for his wife to finish shopping. He meets an older man (Andy Griffith) who, like him, is "waitin' on a woman". The older man explains over the next two verses that, although he has often had to wait for his wife, he does not mind doing so ("I don't guess we've been anywhere / She hasn't made us late, I swear / Sometimes she does it just 'cause she can do it"). He tells the younger man that he will often find himself "waitin' on a woman" as well. In the third verse, the older male observes that he will most likely die before his wife does ("I've read somewhere statistics show / The man's always the first to go"). After making this realization, he finally states that he will wait for his wife in Heaven (should he die first), because he, too, "[doesn't] mind waitin' on a woman". In the end, the old man is seen sitting on a white bench, wearing a white suit, on a lone beach, waiting for his wife to join him.

History
According to Country Weekly magazine, songwriter Wynn Varble received a call from his friend telling him that their former co-worker was in the hospital. Varble wrote the song after calling his co-worker at the hospital, wondering where his wife was. He told "the story and the idea [he] had for [the song]" to co-writer Don Sampson. After a few days, Varble and Sampson played "Waitin' on a Woman" for Paisley, and he decided to record it.

Critical reception
The song received a "thumbs up" review from the country music review site Engine 145. Reviewer Matt C. stated that the central character (i.e., Paisley's character in the song) "offer[s] abundant examples of a woman's imperfections while portraying himself as the guy who tolerates it all out of the goodness of his heart…look[ing] like a good guy without degrading his female companion". He considered it a superior counterpart to Paisley's late 2003-early 2004 single "Little Moments" (in which the lead character lists off various mistakes his wife has made before admitting that he "live[s] for little moments like that"), but, unlike with "Little Moments", the reviewer thought that the gender observations in "Waitin' on a Woman" were "delicately appropriate rather than insensitively obtuse". Leeann Ward, reviewing the song for Country Universe, gave it a B rating. Ward said that while the song with its "sluggish melody, is built on the stereotype that a woman is always late, there is a sweetness about the sentiment’s presentation that rescues it."

Music video
Paisley has referred to "Waitin' on a Woman" as "one of the most important songs" that he's ever recorded. Because of the importance that he places on the song, Paisley asked Andy Griffith to star in the music video, as he felt that Griffith's personality matched the personality of the older man in the song. Griffith speaks the old man's lines in the video as well. Jim Shea and Peter Tilden directed the video.

In August 2008, the song's video mix, complete with Griffith's vocals, was sent to radio as well. This mix is also included on Paisley's 2008 album Play.

The video was shot in Nags Head, North Carolina at milepost 16's Tanger Outlets.

Parody
In January 2009, parodist Cledus T. Judd released a parody entitled "Waitin' on Obama", referencing Barack Obama's election as President of the United States.

Chart performance
"Waitin' on a Woman" debuted at number 51 on the Billboard Hot Country Songs chart dated for the week of 28 June 2008. For the chart week of 20 September 2008, it has become Paisley's twelfth Number One single overall.

Year-end charts

References

External links
Lyrics at CMT.com

2008 singles
Brad Paisley songs
Country ballads
2000s ballads
Song recordings produced by Frank Rogers (record producer)
Arista Nashville singles
Songs written by Wynn Varble
Songs written by Don Sampson
2005 songs